Gas South, based in Atlanta, Georgia, United States, is a natural gas provider that serves more than 425,000 residential, commercial and governmental customers in Georgia, Florida, North Carolina, South Carolina, New Jersey and Ohio.

Company
Gas South began operations in 2006 as a wholly owned subsidiary of Cobb Electric Membership Corporation. Georgia’s natural gas industry was partially deregulated in 1997 with the passing of the Natural Gas Competition and Deregulation Act, giving commercial and residential customers in many parts of the state a range of options. Under deregulation, the local distribution company, Atlanta Gas Light Company (AGLC), elected to no longer serve as a retail gas supplier and instead solely maintain and operate the distribution system. AGL is responsible for ensuring gas delivery, managing storage assets and transportation services on behalf of natural gas marketers. In turn, natural gas marketers sell gas directly to retail customers on a competitive basis.

Gas South is a provider of natural gas in the southeastern U.S. Following the acquisition of Infinite Energy in December 2020, Gas South now serves more than 425,000 residential, business and governmental customers in Georgia, Florida, North Carolina, South Carolina, Ohio and New Jersey. 

Gas South is led by President and Chief Executive Officer Kevin Greiner, Chief Operating Officer Manon Brochu, Chief Financial Officer Jamie Tiernan, Chief Supply and Risk Officer Freddy Cardozo, Chief Legal and People Officer Stacy Paez and Chief Sales and Marketing Officer David Malone.

References

Natural gas companies of the United States
Energy infrastructure in Georgia (U.S. state)
Companies based in Atlanta
Energy companies established in 2006
Non-renewable resource companies established in 2006
2006 establishments in Georgia (U.S. state)